Caroline Kate (Kay) Young (born January 30, 1944) is a Canadian former politician. She represented the riding of Terra Nova in the Newfoundland and Labrador House of Assembly from 1993 to 1996 as a member of the Liberal Party.

The daughter of Wallace Diamond and Nellie Emberley, she was born Caroline Kate Diamond in Whitbourne, Newfoundland and Labrador and was educated at Memorial University. She was a teacher in Lethbridge from 1967 to 1993. She married Walter Young.

She defeated Progressive Conservative incumbent Glen Greening to win a seat in the Newfoundland assembly in 1993. Young was Minister of Social Services and Minister responsible for the Status of Women. She ran unsuccessfully in the redistributed riding of Bonavista South in 1996, losing to Roger Fitzgerald.

References

Liberal Party of Newfoundland and Labrador MHAs
Women MHAs in Newfoundland and Labrador
Living people
1944 births
People from Whitbourne, Newfoundland and Labrador